Luis Lobo and Javier Sánchez were the defending champions, but lost in the second round to Tomás Carbonell and Francisco Roig.

Donald Johnson and Francisco Montana won the title, defeating David Adams and Brett Steven, 6–2, 7–5.

Seeds
Champion seeds are indicated in bold text while text in italics indicates the round in which those seeds were eliminated. The top four seeds received a bye to the second round.

Draw

Finals

Top half

Bottom half

References

Doubles
ATP German Open